Mingrui (Manchu: , mingšui, ; (?March 1768) was the first General of Ili from October 1762 to March 1767 and then Governor-general of Yunnan and Guizhou from April 1767 to March 1768. A son-in-law of the Qianlong Emperor of the Qing dynasty, Mingrui was appointed by the emperor to lead a 50,000-strong invasion force led by the elite Manchu Bannermen in the third campaign of the Qing invasions of Burma. While his 1767–1768 campaign was the most successful of the four invasions by the Chinese, his army was annihilated at the Battle of Maymyo in March 1768. He committed suicide, and sent in his queue to the emperor as a token of loyalty. The Qianglong emperor ordered Manchu general Eledeng'e (also spelled E'erdeng'e (額爾登額) or possibly 額爾景額) to be sliced to death after his commander Mingrui was defeated at the Battle of Maymyo in 1768 because Eledeng'i was not able to help flank Mingrui when he did not arrive at a rendezvous.

He was a nephew of Fuheng, the chief grand councilor to the emperor, who led the last and final campaign of 1769.

See also
 Ten Great Campaigns
 Xinjiang under Qing rule

References

Qing dynasty generals
1768 deaths
Year of birth unknown
Suicides by hanging in China
Qing dynasty politicians
Manchu politicians
Viceroys of Yun-Gui
Bannermen